Orthogonius alutaceus is a species of ground beetle in the subfamily Orthogoniinae. It was described by Quedenfeldt in 1883.

References

alutaceus
Beetles described in 1883